Bhairava Geetha is a 2018 Indian Kannada-Telugu bilingual romantic action film jointly written by Ram Gopal Verma and Ram Vamsi Krishna while directed by Siddharth Thatholu. The film is produced jointly by veteran Ram Gopal Verma and Bhaskar Rashi under the production banner Rashi Combines. The film stars Dhananjay and Irra Mor in the main lead prominent roles.

Ravi Shankar was roped into composing music for the film while cinematography is handled by Jagadeesh Cheekati, and editing is done by Anwar Ali. The film had its theatrical release on 14 December 2018 and opened to mixed and mostly negative reviews from critics and audiences with mainly the story and screenplay being criticised despite a well composed performances from Dhananjay and Irra Mor.

Cast 
 Dhananjay as Bhairava
 Irra Mor as Geetha
 Bala Rajwadi as a Geetha's father, and village chieftain
 Laxman Meesala

Plot 
Geetha (Irra Mor), who belongs to a family with a hard-core faction backdrop, returns to her village after finishing her studies. She then falls in love with her father's henchman (Bhairava). The couple elopes when her father orders to kill Bhairava. The remaining plot of the story, including the climax, reveals how Bhairava and Geetha tackle the challenges.

Production 
The film title, Bhairava Geetha, was set according to the names of the lead characters in the film. The film was officially made in Kannada-language and was dubbed in the Telugu version with the same name. This film was also the 30th film to be written and produced by Ram Gopal Varma. The official trailer for the film was released on 1 September 2018.

Soundtrack

Censorship 
The film also faced censorship issues and was supposed to be released on 21 October 2018 but was postponed to 14 December 2018. The film received "A" certificate from the censor board.

Release 
The film was released worldwide on 14 December 2018 and received mixed reviews after several postponements due to the censorship issues with the Board. The film had earlier scheduled to hit the screens in the box office race with 2.0 on 30 November 2018 but postponed to 7 December 2018.

Critical reception 
The story of the film is set to be old but was set in a good tone but was criticised for its screenplay. The first half of the film was appreciated, but the second half was criticised for the over exposure of violence. The Sify gave 2 out of 5 stars, stating that the plot of the story is a shallow tale of forbidden love.

References

External links 

 

2018 films
2010s Kannada-language films
2010s Telugu-language films
2018 masala films
Indian romantic action films
Indian multilingual films